Philippine Airlines (PAL), a trade name of PAL Holdings, Inc. (PSE: PAL) (Philippine Air Lines until 1970), is the flag carrier airline of the Philippines. Headquartered at the PNB Financial Center in Pasay, the airline was founded in 1941 and is the first and oldest commercial airline in Asia.

The airline's main flight operations are located at Ninoy Aquino International Airport in Metro Manila. Its subsidiary PAL Express mainly operates regional routes while PAL operates both domestic (Cebu, Davao, General Santos, Kalibo, Laoag, Manila, and Zamboanga) and international routes.

History 

Its predecessor company, Philippine Aerial Taxi Company, was founded on December 3, 1930.

Formerly one of the largest airlines in Asia, PAL was severely affected by the 1997 Asian financial crisis. In one of the Philippines' biggest corporate failures, PAL downsized its international operations by ending flights to Europe and the Middle East, cutting virtually all domestic flights except routes operated from Manila, reducing the size of its fleet, and laying off thousands of employees. 

The airline was placed under receivership in 1998 but later restored operations to many destinations. After PAL's exit from receivership in 2007, the airline has frequently revamped its management, seeking to re-establish itself as one of Asia's premier carriers.

Corporate affairs 

Philippine Airlines is owned by PAL Holdings, a holding company responsible for the airline's operations. PAL Holdings is part of a group of companies owned by business tycoon Lucio Tan. ANA Holdings, the holding company of All Nippon Airways, has a 9.5% stake in PAL Holdings.

The airline is headquartered at the Philippine National Bank Financial Headquarters along Macapagal Boulevard in Pasay City. In 2017, PAL was the ninth-largest corporation in the Philippines in terms of gross revenue, as ranked by BusinessWorld. As of December 2018, PAL had 6,689 employees, including 999 pilots and 2,647 cabin crew.

Business highlights
For the fiscal year ending on March 31, 2007, Philippine Airlines reported a net income of US$140.3 million (₱6.79 billion), the largest profit in its 76-year history. This allowed it to exit receivership in October 2007. PAL forecasted its net profits would reach US$32.32 million in the fiscal year, a profit goal of US$26.28 million in 2009, and an expected profit of US$47.41 million for 2010. However, these profit levels proved difficult to achieve, and the airline announced a large loss in early 2009.

PAL became profitable again in 2010 but continued to be unprofitable from 2011 until it reported its first profit in four years in 2014. Meanwhile, here are the business highlights of PAL from 2015 onwards:

Destinations 

In 1980, PAL operated to destinations in Europe, such as Amsterdam, Athens, Frankfurt, London–Gatwick and Rome–Fiumicino. Following the 1997 Asian financial crisis, PAL dropped some of its long-haul flights, with Cathay Pacific temporarily taking over PAL's routes for fourteen days in 1998.

In 2010, the European Union (EU) banned Philippine carriers until 2013, despite the safety assessment by the International Civil Aviation Organization. After the EU lifted its ban, PAL resumed its flights to London–Heathrow on November 4, 2013. On October 29, 2018, the airline launched a non-stop flight to New York–JFK using an Airbus A350-900. At the time of its launch, it was the ninth longest flight in the world. On April 29, 2021, PAL announced its plans to fly to Israel by October, using its Airbus A350-900. The airline previously operated in Israel from the mid-1940s to the 1950s.

In 2021, PAL operated up to 43 international and 31 domestic routes. Its subsidiary, PAL Express, serves the most domestic flights in the Philippines.

Codeshare agreements 
Philippine Airlines codeshares with the following airlines:

 Air Macau
 All Nippon Airways
 Bangkok Airways
 Cathay Pacific 
 China Airlines 
 Garuda Indonesia
 Gulf Air
 Hawaiian Airlines
 Malaysia Airlines
 PAL Express (Subsidiary)
 Royal Brunei Airlines
 Turkish Airlines
 Vietnam Airlines
 WestJet
 XiamenAir

Fleet 

, there are 46 aircraft registered in the PAL mainline fleet, including a mix of Airbus narrow-body and wide-body aircraft and Boeing wide-body aircraft.

Branding

Logo 
The Philippine Airlines logo changed four times since the company's founding. Its first logo incorporated a blue oval with "PAL" superimposed in white letters, a four-pointed star with points intersecting behind the "A" in PAL, and a wing whose orientation varied depending on the location of the logo. The wing pointed to the right if located on the left side of the plane, and to the left if on the right side. A variant of this logo featured a globe instead of the blue oval with the superimposed PAL initials. It was used from the 1950s through the mid-1960s.

The second logo adopted a blue triangle with the bottom point missing and a red triangle superimposed upon it, enclosed by a circle. This was meant to evoke a vertically-displayed national flag with white forming by the negative space between the two triangles. In the mid-1970s, a third logo was introduced that removed the circle and simplified the shape. The typeface used in the third logo was later applied to the second logo and remained the official PAL logo until 1986.

The current PAL logo features the same two blue and red sail triangles used in the second and third logos. An eight-rayed yellow sunburst was superimposed on top of the blue triangle, and a new Helvetica typeface was used.

Livery 

PAL liveries have undergone many incarnations. The first PAL aircraft bore a simple white-top, silver-bottom livery separated by solid straight cheatlines, with a small Philippine flag superimposed on the tail. The name "Philippine Air Lines" was superimposed on the upper forward portion of the fuselage and the PAL logo was located at the back. Later variants of the livery, especially on PAL jet aircraft, made use of an extended Philippine flag as cheatlines, with the PAL logo superimposed on the tail. By this time, the name "Philippine Airlines" was used in the livery.

Another variant of the original livery used by PAL is somewhat similar to the current livery. However, it uses PAL's third logo on the tail with blue, white, and red cheatlines running the center of the fuselage. Later on, the bottom half of the fuselage was also painted white

The current "Eurowhite" livery, first used with the Short 360, was adopted in 1986 following PAL's corporate rebranding. This livery, (designed by Landor Associates) has "Philippines" superimposed on the forward portion of the fuselage in italics (using the PAL logo typeface),  while the tail is painted with the logo and the Philippine flag is visible near the rear of the aircraft. The PAL logo is also painted on the winglets of aircraft that have them. The name "Philippines", instead of "Philippine Airlines", is to denote that PAL is the primary flag carrier of the Philippines. However, this sometimes leads to confusion that a PAL plane, especially when chartered by the President for official or state visits, is, in fact, the official air transport of the Philippine head of state. Any PAL aircraft with the flight number "PR/PAL 001" and the callsign "PHILIPPINE ONE" is a special plane operated by Philippine Airlines to transport the President or Vice President of the Philippines. The flight number "PR/PAL 002" and the callsign "PHILIPPINE TWO" are used if the Vice President travels simultaneously with the President. As such, the presidential seals are patched on or near the L1 and R1 doors of any PAL aircraft chartered by the president.

For the airline's 70th anniversary in 2011, a special decal was placed on all of its aircraft. The sticker featured a stylized "70" and the words, "Asia's first, shining through". For its 75th anniversary in 2016, a special decal was put on the back of every aircraft. The sticker features a stylized "75".PAL also placed a 4-star Skytrax sticker on its aircraft to celebrate its new rating.

In February 2019, Philippine Airlines rolled out its fifth Airbus A350 aircraft with a LoveBus decal that represents the 40th anniversary of its partnership with Airbus and to celebrate the airline's signature heartfelt service. The kiss-marked LoveBus logo was also placed in 1979 on one of PAL's Airbus A300 that represented their first year of partnership with Airbus. Its LoveBus A350 was rolled out from the paint shop and was accepted on February 14, 2019, Valentine's Day. PAL took delivery of it three days later, and held a welcoming ceremony at Ninoy Aquino International Airport Terminal 2.

Frequent-flyer program 

Mabuhay Miles is Philippine Airlines' frequent-flyer program. It was established in 2002 after merging all of PAL's existing frequent flyer programs before the Asian financial crisis. Mabuhay Miles are divided into multiple tiers: Classic, Elite, Premiere Elite, and Million Miler.  Philippine National Bank issues co-branded credit cards, debit cards, and prepaid cards that offer benefits such as free mileage points, travel insurance, priority check-in, access to a Mabuhay Lounge, and discounts when booking flights on the Philippine Airlines website.

Mabuhay Lounge 

The Mabuhay Lounge is the airport lounge for Philippine Airlines. Business Class and Elite Members of Mabuhay Miles can use the lounge. These lounges have open bars, food catering, Wi-Fi, and charging ports for personal electronic devices. On June 27, 2018, Philippine Airlines unveiled a new Mabuhay Lounge for international business class, million millers, premier elite, and elite passengers at Terminal 2 of Mactan–Cebu International Airport.

The Mabuhay Lounge can be found at the following airports: Ninoy Aquino International Airport Terminal 2, Puerto Princesa International Airport, Bacolod–Silay Airport, Mactan–Cebu International Airport, Laguindingan Airport, Francisco Bangoy International Airport, Iloilo International Airport, and San Francisco International Airport.

In-flight services

Cabin 
Philippine Airlines currently offers three classes of service: Business, Premium Economy, and Economy depending on the aircraft. Its Airbus A330s and Airbus A350s offer three classes, while its other aircraft offer two classes. On September 15, 2022, the airline rebranded its premium economy service to Comfort Class for its domestic flights.

In 2017, PAL reconfigured the cabin layout of eight A330s, from a single class 414-seater into a 309-seater tri-class with Business, Premium Economy, and Economy sections. The reconfigured A330s were rolled out within seven months in 2017. The IFEs were Zodiac's RAVE system. The seats were designed by Lift Strategic Design, and Lufthansa Technik Philippines performed the reconfiguration.

The previous aircraft acquired had no embedded in-flight entertainment (IFE), except for Boeing 777-300ERs. Instead, they offered rentable (Economy) or complementary (Business) iPad Minis with OnAir's wireless IFE solution, OnAir Play. New aircraft have embedded IFE, due to the failure of PAL's wireless IFE program for long-haul flights. They still offer wireless IFE on all aircraft.

Business class 

Business Class is available on all aircraft. It offers increased legroom and lie-flat seats on the Airbus A330, Boeing 777, Airbus A350, select Airbus A321neo. Philippine Airlines is the only Philippine carrier to offer business class on domestic flights. On medium-haul and long-haul flights, Philippine Airlines provides amenity kits from L'Occitane en Provence.

Seats on the early Boeing 777s feature angled-flat seats manufactured by Recaro, while some of the latest aircraft feature lie-flat seats by Zodiac Aerospace (now Safran), arranged in a 2-3-2 configuration. Reconfigured Airbus A330s and the Airbus A350 feature lie-flat seats manufactured by Thompson Aero Seating, in a seating configuration of 1-2-1. A350 and A330 Business Class seats also feature Lantal air cushions, a four-way headrest, a storage shelf for personal belongings, a headphone hook, and a padded inner shell that absorbs noise.

Seats feature 15-inch (Boeing 777), 18.5-inch (Airbus A330 and Airbus A350), and 15.4-inch (Airbus A321neo) personal in-flight entertainment monitors with video on demand, as well as in-seat power. The seats feature a USB port where passengers can charge mobile devices. Passengers are also given noise-cancelling headphones. Select Airbus A321neos also feature lie-flat seats manufactured by Rockwell Collins (now Collins Aerospace), arranged in a 2-2 layout. They have a 60-inch seat pitch and a maximum seat width of 23 inches when fully flat. They feature a laptop power supply (both AC and USB).

Premium economy 
Premium Economy (known as Comfort Class for domestic flights since September 2022) is available on the Airbus A330 and Airbus A350, as well as PAL Express flights using two-class Airbus A320s . The seats are similar in design to standard economy class seats but feature at least four to five inches of additional legroom, providing a minimum legroom of 34 to 36 inches.

Reconfigured A330s, as well as A350s, have a different seat design with a layer of extra padding. It is 9.55" wide, pitched at 38 inches with eight inches of recline. The seats also feature a 13.3-inch screen-flight entertainment unit with video on demand, a headphone jack, a USB port, and in-seat power. On aircraft without IFE, passengers are also treated to complimentary iPads.

Economy class 
Economy class is available on all aircraft. Tray tables are found in the back of the seat in front, except for bulkhead and exit seats, where tray tables are embedded in the seats. They have four-way headrests. The seats offer a pitch that varies between 31 and 34 inches. Each seat offers video on demand and is equipped with 9-inch (Boeing 777) or 10-inch (Airbus A330, Airbus A321neo) monitors with a headphone jack and USB port for charging. They have four-way headrests and six inches of recline. An articulating seat bottom cushion comes with extra foam under the seat cover.

Accidents and incidents 

Although Philippine Airlines aircraft have been involved in a string of accidents since its founding in 1941, the majority of airline accidents have occurred with propeller aircraft during the airline's early years of operations. Few PAL jet aircraft have been involved in accidents, the most notable being the explosion onboard Philippine Airlines Flight 434, masterminded by al-Qaeda through Project Bojinka.

Safety 
In February 2007, PAL was the first airline in the Philippines to be accredited by the International Air Transport Association, passing the IATA Operational Safety Audit (IOSA). Philippine Airlines has the highest safety rating of 7/7 according to AirlineRatings.com and was rated a safer airline than some of its Southeast Asian counterparts.

Issues

Financial issues
PAL experienced significant financial losses in the late 2000s. On March 31, 2006, PAL's consolidated total assets amounted to ₱100,984,477, an 11% decrease from March 31, 2005. On March 31, 2007, the company's consolidated assets continued to diminish by 8%, an amount equivalent to ₱92,837,849, compared to 2006 figures. The decline of PAL's assets was primarily due to a net decrease in property and equipment and advance payments to aircraft and engine manufacturers. On March 31, 2007, other current and noncurrent assets fell by 29% to ₱2,960.4 million and by 20% to ₱2,941.7 million "due to the effect of re-measurement to the fair value of certain financial assets and derivative instruments". After carrying 17% more passengers in 2009 due to acquisition of additional aircraft and growth in the local market, PAL annual income report showed an increase in revenues of US$1.634 billion from US$1.504 billion in 2008. Despite this, PAL expenses escalated as a result of more flight operations and higher maintenance costs aggravated by fuel price fluctuations; forty-four percent (44%) of PAL income operating expenditures is utilized for fuel consumption.

Labor issues
PAL has a history of labor relations problems. On June 15, 1998, PAL retrenched 5,000 employees, including more than 1,400 flight attendants and stewards to reduce costs and alleviate the financial downturn in the airline industry. Represented by the Flight Attendants and Stewards Association of the Philippines (FASAP), retrenched employee sought remedy through the judicial process, filing a complaint on the grounds of unfair labor practices and illegal retrenchment. It took a decade before the suit was finally settled. It passed the Labor Arbiter to the National Labor Relations Commission, then on to the Court of Appeals, and the Supreme Court. The Philippine Highest Tribunal favored the aggrieved party and on July 22, 2008, in its 32-page decision ordered PAL to: Reinstate the cabin crew personnel who were covered by the retrenchment of and demotion scheme of June 15, 1998, made effective on July 15, 1998, without loss of seniority right and other privileges, and to pay them full back wages, inclusive of allowances and other monetary benefits computed from the time of their separation up to the time of actual reinstatement, provided that those who have received their respective separation pay, the number of payments shall be deducted from their back wages. The Supreme Court ruling explained that there was a failure on the part of PAL to substantiate its claims of actual and imminent substantial losses. Although the Asian financial downturn severely affected the airline, PAL's defense of bankruptcy and rehabilitation was considered untenable; hence, the retrenchment policy was deemed unjustified. On March 26, 2018, the Supreme Court en banc voted in favor of Philippine Airlines, which affirms the 2006 Court of Appeals decision that says Philippine Airlines is not required to consult FASAP for its criteria for its retrenchment program.

Competition
For more than twenty years, PAL monopolized the air transport industry in the Philippines. This ended in 1995 through the passage of Executive Order No. 219 which permitted the entry of new airlines into the industry. The liberalization and deregulation of the Philippine airline industry brought competition into the domestic air transport industry resulting in lower airfares, improvements in the quality of services, and efficiency in the industry in general. At present, three airlines are competing in international and major domestic routes: PAL, Cebu Pacific, and PAL Express. Several airlines serve the minor and short-distance routes including Philippines AirAsia and Cebgo.

See also 
 List of airlines of the Philippines
 List of airports in the Philippines
 List of companies of the Philippines
 Filipinos in the New York metropolitan area
 Transportation in the Philippines

References

External links 

 Official website
 PAL Express official website
 Mabuhay Miles, Philippine Airlines' rewards program

 
Government-owned airlines
Airlines established in 1941
Airlines formerly banned in the European Union
Association of Asia Pacific Airlines
Aviation schools in the Philippines
Companies based in Pasay
Philippine brands
Companies listed on the Philippine Stock Exchange
Companies that filed for Chapter 11 bankruptcy in 2021